Mummuciidae is a family of solifuges, first described by Carl Friedrich Roewer in 1934.

Genera 
, the World Solifugae Catalog accepts the following ten genera:

References

Taxa described in 1934
Taxa named by Carl Friedrich Roewer
Solifugae
Arachnid families